Mule Barn was a town in Pawnee County, Oklahoma, United States. Its population was zero on both the 1990 and 2000 censuses.

The town was located at 36.21737 N, 96.31142 W.

Oklahoma law provides for the dissolution of towns under certain circumstances, including the lack of recent elections.  Mule Barn was dissolved in 2008.

References

Towns in Pawnee County, Oklahoma
Towns in Oklahoma
Populated places disestablished in 2008
Former municipalities in Oklahoma